The Colombo Stars (abbreviated as CS) is a franchise cricket team which competes in 2021 Lanka Premier League. The team is based in Colombo, Western Province, Sri Lanka. In November 2021, the team changed their name to Colombo Stars after changing owners. The team was captained by Dhananjaya de Silva for few initial games as an acting captain until Angelo Mathews recover and coached by Ruwan Kalpage.

Current squad 
 Players with international caps are listed in bold.
  denotes a player who is currently unavailable for selection.
  denotes a player who is unavailable for rest of the season.

Administration and support staff

Season standings

Points table

League matches

Playoffs

Eliminator

Statistics

Most runs

Most wickets

References 

2021 Lanka Premier League